The Naqvis are a Sayyid clan, found predominantly in Iran, Iraq, and the South Asian countries. They claim descent from the Imam Ali al-Hadi, who is also known as 'Naqi' and the Tenth Imam, and through him they trace their lineage to the Islamic prophet Muhammad through his younger grandson Husayn ibn Ali.

Lineage 
There are differing opinions about the number of sons of Imam Ali al-Naqi. The statement of 7 sons has been made by Ayatullah Syed Basheer Hussain, compiler of the book Shajrate Saddate Amroha, who lists:

 Al-Hasan al-'Askarī and his brothers:
 Muhammad ibn Ali al-Hadi
 Husayn
 'Abdullāh
 Zayd
 Mūsā
 Ja'far ibn 'Ali al-Hādi , also known as Ja'far al-Zaki or Ja'far Ath-Thāni.

These seven names have also been referenced in the book Anwar-e-Alsadat.  In addition, there are at least two people whose hand-written pedigree from the beginning (Imam Naqi) to the end have been accepted. These pedigrees confirm the sons of Imam Ali Naqi Al Hadi as seven in number.

Besides Al-Hasan Al-'Askarī, three of the sons, Husayn, Muhammad and Ja'far, and one daughter named 'Ayliyā' from different wives have been mentioned by various scholars, including Shaikh Mufeed.

Naqvis of Abdullapur Meerut 

Naqvi sadaat are also found in Abdullapur, Meerut. They are descendants of Jalaluddin Surkh-Posh Bukhari through Syed Sadarudin Shah Kabir Naqvi Al Bukhari  warrior and chief advisor of King Sikandar Lodi and father of great saint Shah Jewna . They were jagirdars before implementation of Zamidari Abolition Act, 1950. The Pakistani writer, linguist and critic Syed Qudrat Naqvi was born in Abdullapur, he was also known as Syed Shuja’at Ali Naqvi Al-Bukhari; he migrated to Pakistan after the partition of India.

Notable Naqvi Sayyids 

Jalaluddin Surkh-Posh Bukhari, a Sufi saint from Bukhara of Suhrawardiyya Sufi Order 
Jahaniyan Jahangasht, a Sufi saint from Multan, Pakistan of Suhrawardiyya Sufi Order through the youngest son and successor of Jalaluddin Surkh-Posh Bukhari. He was the successor as "Makhdoom E Jahania" after his father.
Muhammad al-Makki a paternal cousin of Jalaluddin Surkh Posh, through the common ancestor Ja'far ibn Ali al-Hadi. Jalaluddin also married into his family of which the current lineage is from.
Syed Dewan Shah Abdul Baqi Bewali Guzri a sufi saint from Bewal-Rawalpindi, Pakistan, son of Syed Abdul Wahid Guzri a descendant of Syed Hussain Sharfuddin Shah Wilaayat
Shah Jewna Naqvi Al Bukhari, a great saint from Kannauj.His father was a warrior and chief advisor of King Sikandar Lodi. 
Syed Muhammad Jewan Shah Naqvi, a Sufi saint from Sialkot, Pakistan. He is also known as Sher Sarwar Sarkar 
Syed Hussain Sharfuddin Shah Wilayat Naqvi, Amroha  of Suhrawardiyya Sufi Order 
Syed Muhammad Channan Shah Nuri, a Sufi saint from Allo Mahar, Pakistan of Naqshbandi Sufi Order. Descended from Syed Muhammad Jewan Shah Naqvi
Brigadier Syed Mujtaba Tirmizi, a Pakistani military senior officer and a filmmaker. 
Syed Sadequain Ahmed Naqvi, a Pakistani calligrapher and painter 
Syed Shehanshah Hussain Naqvi, a Pakistani Shia scholar 
Allama Syed Jawad Naqvi, a Pakistani Shia scholar and Islamic Revolutionary Cleric
Mukhtar Abbas Naqvi, an Indian politician who is the current Cabinet Minister Of Minority Affairs India Government and MP
Syed Firdous Shamim Naqvi, a Pakistani politician who is the current leader of the opposition in the Provincial Assembly of Sindh
Syed Kamal Amrohi, also known as Syed Amir Haider Kamal Naqvi, an Indian film director, producer and screenwriter
 Syed Imran Abbas Naqvi, a Pakistani actor, singer, former model and producer 
Syed Mahmood Naqvi, an Indian scientist, known for development of geochemistry in India and pre-Cambrian geology of South India
Syed Zafar Ul Hassan Naqvi, a Major General in Pakistan Army

Kalbe Jawad Naqvi
H. M. Naqvi
 
Mohsin Naqvi
Arif Naqvi, Pakistani businessman who was the founder and chief executive of the Dubai-based private equity firm, The Abraaj Group and Aman Foundation
Syed Wajih Ahmad Naqvi
Ghulam-us-Saqlain Naqvi
Saeed Naqvi
Kalbe Razi Naqvi
Dildar Ali Naseerabadi, a.k.a. Syed Dildar Ali Naqvi 
Maulana Ali Naqi Naqvi, a.k.a. "Naqqan Sahib"

Syed Mohsin Raza Naqvi
Yasir Naqvi
Syed Sajid Ali Naqvi

References

External links
Naqvi.info

Husaynids
Shi'ite surnames
Social groups of Pakistan
Pakistani people of Arab descent
Muslim communities of India
Hashemite people